Lady Violet (born Francesca Messina, 10 September 1972, Florence, Italy) is an Italian musician. Francesca's musical career started in the 90's as a singer in the Italian vocal ensemble Jubilee Shouters by which she recorded the album Black & Blue under the Sensible Records (3) label. In the meantime she collaborated with other labels as a vocalist for a few dance projects, such as the New Music International label being both vocalist and frontwoman for the Euro House/Italodance project Lady Violet.

Lady Violet released her first single, "Inside to Outside", with success in Italy, Sweden, Denmark, Belgium, Norway, France, and the United Kingdom. The song is a cover song first published by Limahl in 1986. The second single, "Beautiful World", peaked at No. 19 on the Italian singles chart.

Discography

Singles

References

1972 births
Living people
Eurodance musicians
Italian dance musicians
21st-century Italian singers
21st-century Italian women singers